Cozad is a city in Dawson County, Nebraska, United States. The population was 3,977 at the 2010 census. The town is on the Great Plains of central Nebraska, along the Union Pacific Railroad and U.S. Route 30, just north of the Platte River. The 100th meridian, which roughly marks the eastward boundary of the arid plains, passes just west of the town as is marked nearby on a prominent sign across U.S. 30. In the early 1860s, the meridian was a stop along the Pony Express.

History
Cozad was founded in 1873 by John J. Cozad, murderer, gambler, Ohio native, and father of painter Robert Henri. Cozad was often regarded as immoral among the citizens of the early town. He purchased 40,000 acres of land from the Union Pacific Railroad and laid out the future town.  He built houses on some of the land to entice people to settle.  He sold off most of the land to future residents who named the town after him.  Cozad also founded Cozaddale, Ohio, a small, unincorporated village 25 miles northeast of Cincinnati.

The city includes at least two museums:  the 100th Meridian Museum and the Robert Henri Museum.

The Cozad Downtown Historic District, an area roughly bounded by 9th, 7th, H & F Sts., was listed on the National Register of Historic Places in 2018.  The Hendee Hotel, the main building of the Robert Henri Museum and Allen's Opera House are also NRHP-listed.

Geography
Cozad is located at  (40.862141, -99.984082).

Demographics

Cozad is part of the Lexington, Nebraska Micropolitan Statistical Area.

2010 census
At the 2010 census there were 3,977 people in 1,656 households, including 1,058 families, in the city. The racial makeup of the city was 92.4% White, 0.4% African American, 0.4% Native American, 0.3% Asian, 5.2% from other races, and 1.3% from two or more races. Hispanic or Latino of any race were 13.3%.

Of the 1,656 households 33.1% had children under the age of 18 living with them, 47.8% were married couples living together, 10.3% had a female householder with no husband present, 5.9% had a male householder with no wife present, and 36.1% were non-families. 31.6% of households were one person and 15.4% were one person aged 65 or older. The average household size was 2.35 and the average family size was 2.92.

The median age was 39.3 years. 26.2% of residents were under the age of 18; 7% were between the ages of 18 and 24; 24% were from 25 to 44; 24.9% were from 45 to 64; and 17.8% were 65 or older. The gender makeup of the city was 48.5% male and 51.5% female.

2000 census
At the 2000 census, there were 4,163 people in 1,722 households, including 1,127 families, in the city. The population density was 2,007.2 people per square mile (776.5/km). There were 1,851 housing units at an average density of 892.5 per square mile (345.3/km). The racial makeup of the city was 93.39% White, 0.17% African American, 0.43% Native American, 0.43% Asian, 3.82% from other races, and 1.75% from two or more races. Hispanic or Latino of any race were 10.95% of the population.

Of the 1,722 households 32.0% had children under the age of 18 living with them, 52.6% were married couples living together, 8.9% had a female householder with no husband present, and 34.5% were non-families. 30.4% of households were one person and 14.7% were one person aged 65 or older. The average household size was 2.37 and the average family size was 2.95.

The age distribution was 26.4% under the age of 18, 7.8% from 18 to 24, 27.0% from 25 to 44, 22.2% from 45 to 64, and 16.6% 65 or older. The median age was 37 years. For every 100 females, there were 92.8 males. For every 100 females age 18 and over, there were 90.8 males.

The median household income was $32,392, and the median family income  was $43,413. Males had a median income of $27,217 versus $20,089 for females. The per capita income for the city was $18,139. About 9.8% of families and 12.1% of the population were below the poverty line, including 17.1% of those under age 18 and 11.3% of those age 65 or over.

Government
Cozad uses an elected mayor and a city council consisting of four council members, with the city clerk handling day-to-day operations. The city also has a seven-member police department with centralized dispatch out of the county sheriff's office in Lexington.

Notable people
 Heather Armbrust, IFBB professional bodybuilder, was born in Cozad
 Dan Christensen, American abstract painter, was born in Cozad
 Jared Crick, NFL defensive end
 Kirstin Cronn-Mills, young adult author 
 Chris Dishman, NFL lineman
 Robert Henri, American painter of the Ashcan School, was the son of John J. Cozad.  His boyhood home, the Hendee Hotel, now the Robert Henri Museum, is open to the public in the summer months.

References

External links
 City of Cozad

Cozad, Nebraska
Lexington Micropolitan Statistical Area
Pony Express stations
1873 establishments in Nebraska
Populated places established in 1873